The Bible Story is a ten-volume series of hardcover children's story books written by Arthur S. Maxwell based on the King James and Revised Standard versions of the Christian Bible.  The books, published from 1953 to 1957, retell most of the narratives of the Bible in 411 stories. Compared to the source material, the stories are sanitized for young readers, and gloss over elements Maxwell apparently found inappropriate for a child audience (there is, for instance, no mention of circumcision despite the relative prominence of this rite in the Bible text or the story of Lot's incestuous relationship with his daughters). Maxwell started making arrangements for The Bible Story over a decade prior to 1959. He said that he spent seven years writing the stories, and considered it his most important work.

The books have been marketed in the United States for many years by placing the first volume, which covers the first part of the Book of Genesis, in doctor's offices with postage prepaid postcards included for readers to order the set or ask for more information. Originally written in English, the books have been translated into French and Spanish (as Las Bellas Historias de la Biblia), and a new revision has been made based on the New International Version (NIV) translation of the Bible. Signs Publishing Company published volumes from the series, which The Age  in 1960 called "a monumental achievement" and noted that "[t]he covers are most attractive". In a 1959 review, the Napa Valley Register said it was "beautifully illustrated with reproductions of an art collection valued at more than $500,000". 14 artists who were from nine countries contributed illustrations to the book. Illustrators included Harry Anderson, Harry Baerg, Vernon Nye, and Russell Harlan.

The Bible Story is jointly published by the Review and Herald Publishing Association and the Pacific Press Publishing Association, both closely associated with the Seventh-day Adventist Church. Maxwell presented the 10 Volume Bible Story set to both Ronald Reagan and John F. Kennedy. The Seventh-Day Adventist slant is discernable especially in passages that deal with the Sabbath, which receives its own chapter ("A Day to Remember") in the first volume of the series. Here Maxwell elaborates on how God revealed the Sabbath to Adam and Eve:

He blessed the Sabbath so it would be a blessing to them.  He set it apart as a holy day not for Himself, but for them.  Even now six thousand years later, all who keep the seventh day holy, find a blessing in it that others never know!

As is evident from this quote, Maxwell also presupposes Young Earth Creationism with a literal six-day creation taking place six thousand years before the present, in accordance with Ussher chronology. The introductory chapter to the first volume encourages the reader to reflect on the origin of animals, humans and the earth itself, asking where everything came from. The reader is pointed to the Bible account as the only trustworthy source:

Many great men have tried to explain these things [i.e., the origins of lifeforms and the planet itself]. They have come up with all sorts of strange ideas and suggestions, but most of them are far from the truth. In only one place - the Bible - will you find the true story. If you will open this wonderful Book, you will find that the very first part is called Genesis, meaning "the book of beginnings." Here you will find the answers to your questions about where everything came from.

The film director Cecil B. DeMille praised the books, writing to Maxwell, "If you have done nothing else with your life but make the Bible simple for children, you have not lived in vain." Queen Elizabeth II and Ivy Baker Priest, the Treasurer of the United States, wrote "fan letters" to Maxwell about the books. The Queen added The Bible Story to the royal library so that Princess Anne and Prince Charles could read it. Priest read the books to her children. The Bible Story has sold over 1.5million copies. The volume of sales was helped by a subscription model.

See also
Bibles for children

References

External links
 The Bible Story – Information and two sample chapters

Bibles for children
Series of books
Seventh-day Adventist media